Bonneville Motorcycle Speed Trials (BMST) (AMA Land Speed Grand Championship) is a motorcycle land speed racing event, held annually at Bonneville Speedway, US. The event is sanctioned by American Motorcyclist Association (AMA) and Fédération Internationale de Motocyclisme (FIM). AMA-certified US National land speed records, and FIM-certified Land speed world records are created in this event. The event features motorcycles ranging from 50-cc to 3000-cc, as well as electric classes.

The event has been held annually since 2004 after Speed Week at the end of August prior to Labor Day.

History

2021
17 new FIM world records and 55 AMA national records were set during the annual event 2021 BMST August 28-September 2. Notable entries include Jaron Tyner and Casper Wyoming's Tyrell Marlow who set new records on a Susuki Tl1000 and a Ducati 999 sidecar, the "Coconut Express" and Zlock racing who set three new FIM world records. SheEMoto award was presented to Sherry Soliz who also earned an AMA National record after breaking the ton (100MPH) on her father's BMW.

2020
The event was cancelled due to COVID 19 pandemic risks and restrictions.

2019
50 AMA national records and 10 FIM world records(pending ratification) were set during the annual event August 24-29th 2019. Team Mobitec became the first traditional sit-on electric powered motorcycle to break .

2018 
In 2018, the annual event was held from 25 to 30 August. 18-year-old Cayla Rivas became the youngest female racer to reach a speed of 252.901 km/h.

2017

2016
The annual event was held from 26 to 31 August.

2015

The event was cancelled in 2015, due to rain and resulting salt flat conditions.

2021 record results

2021 BMST FIM world record results

2021 AMA national record results

2019 record results

2019 BMST FIM world records

2019 BMST AMA national records

2018 record results

2018 BMST FIM world records

2018 BMST AMA national records

AMA national records (1958 – Sept 2021)

External links
 Official website
 On Facebook

References

Motorcycle races
Annual sporting events
American Motorcyclist Association
Fédération Internationale de Motocyclisme
World motorcycle racing series
Motorcycle off-road racing series